Route nationale 5  (RN5) is a primary highway in Madagascar of 402 km. The route runs from Toamasina to Maroantsetra, a city on the eastern coast of the Madagascar.

The first 160 km until Soanierana Ivongo are paved and in good condition, but the remaining is unpaved and in a bad state of conservation.
Several rivers must be crossed by ferry boats. The part from Soanierana Ivongo to Mananara Avaratra is scheduled to be paved in 2022.

Selected locations on route (from North to South)
Maroantsetra
Rantabe (river crossing)
Fahambany (river crossing)
Mananara Avaratra (ferry crossing Mananara river)
Andrangazaha (ferry crossing Simianona river)
Soanierana Ivongo (ferry over Marimbona river / ferry to Nosy Boraha )
Manangory River crossing
Fenoarivo Atsinanana (Fénérive)
(intersection with RN 22)
Mahavelona (Foulpointe)
Toamasina

See also 
 List of roads in Madagascar 
 Transport in Madagascar

References 

Roads in Madagascar
 Roads in Analanjirofo
 Roads in Atsinanana